Lord John's Journal (also known as The Journal of Lord John) is a 5-episode series of American silent mystery films, directed by Edward J. Le Saint and based on a story by Harvey Gates. It stars William Garwood in the lead role.

Episodes
The five episodes are as follows:
Lord John in New York (1915; 4 reels)
The Grey Sisterhood (1916; 3 reels)
Three Fingered Jenny (1916; 3 reels)
The Eye of Horus (1916; 3 reels)
The League of the Future (1916; 3 reels)

Cast
William Garwood as Lord John Haselmore
Stella Razetto as Maida Odell
Ogden Crane as Roger Odell
Walter Belasco as Paola Tostini
Jay Belasco as Antonio Tostini
T. D. Crittenden as Carr Price
Doc Crane as L.J. Calit
Grace Benham as Grace Callender
Laura Oakley as Head Sister
Albert MacQuarrie as Doctor Ramese
Gretchen Lederer

References

External links

1915 films
1916 films
American silent serial films
American black-and-white films
American mystery films
Films directed by Edward LeSaint
1910s mystery films
1910s American films
Silent mystery films